Wu Bin is a Chinese paralympic swimmer. He won the bronze medal in the Men's 50 metre freestyle - S12 event at the 2004 Summer Paralympics in Athens.

References

Living people
Chinese male freestyle swimmers
Paralympic bronze medalists for China
Paralympic swimmers of China
Swimmers at the 2004 Summer Paralympics
Year of birth missing (living people)
Medalists at the 2004 Summer Paralympics
Paralympic medalists in swimming
S12-classified Paralympic swimmers
21st-century Chinese people